Monstress is a 2012 collection of stories by Lysley Tenorio.

Plot
In "Monstress", Filipina actress Reva Gogo and her B-Movie director boyfriend go to Los Angeles hoping that an American director can help them be successful. 

In "Help", a man recruits his nephew to fight the Beatles for being rude to Imelda Marcos. 

In "Superassassin", an isolated boy writes a biographical report on the Green Lantern and practices being a super-powered avenger with disastrous results. 

In "Felix Starro", the grandson of a famous Filipino faith healer plans his escape from the family business. 

In "The Brothers", a man buries his transgender sister with the help of her friend and remembers the brother he lost. 

In "The View From Culion", a young woman raised in a leper colony strikes up a tentative friendship with a US Navy officer afflicted with the disease. 

In "Save the I-Hotel", an elderly man tries to manage his homosexual desire for his oldest friend.

References

External links
 "Lysley Tonorio on Monstress", The Paris Review, January 31, 2012
 "'Monstress': The Beautiful and The Damned", NPR, February 1, 2012
 "Book of the Week: Monstress", Slate, February 24, 2012 
 Interview at The Rumpus, June 14, 2012
 "The Books of 2012 You Never Heard About (But Should've), Slate, November 28, 2012

2012 short story collections
Asian-American short story collections
Filipino-American literature
Ecco Press books